Stillingia lineata is a species of flowering plant in the family Euphorbiaceae, native to Réunion, Mauritius, the South China Sea, Malesia and Fiji.

It was originally described by Jean-Baptiste Lamarck as Sapium lineatum in 1788 and moved to the genus Stillingia in 1866.

References

lineata
Flora of Réunion
Flora of Mauritius
Flora of the South China Sea
Flora of Malesia
Flora of Fiji
Plants described in 1788
Taxa named by Jean-Baptiste Lamarck
Taxa named by Johannes Müller Argoviensis